Mitja Kosmina (born 4 November 1966) is a Slovenian sailor. He competed in the Flying Dutchman event at the 1992 Summer Olympics.

References

External links
 

1966 births
Living people
Slovenian male sailors (sport)
Olympic sailors of Slovenia
Sailors at the 1992 Summer Olympics – Flying Dutchman
Sportspeople from Koper
20th-century Slovenian people